Spencer Nunatak is a prominent nunatak 9 nautical miles (17 km) east-northeast of Mount LeSchack, lying between Wisconsin Range and Long Hills in the Horlick Mountains. Mapped by United States Geological Survey (USGS) from surveys and U.S. Navy air photos, 1959–60. Named by Advisory Committee on Antarctic Names (US-ACAN) for Donald J. Spencer, atmospheric noise scientist, Byrd Station winter party, 1958.

Nunataks of Marie Byrd Land